Gergebilsky District is an administrative and municipal district (raion), one of the forty-one in the Republic of Dagestan, Russia. It is located in the center of the republic. Its administrative center is the rural locality (a selo) of Gergebil. As of the 2010 Census, the total population of the district was 19,910, with the population of Gergebil accounting for 26.1% of that number.

Administrative and municipal status
Within the framework of administrative divisions, Gergebilsky District is one of the forty-one in the Republic of Dagestan. The district is divided into four selsoviets which comprise sixteen rural localities. As a municipal division, the district is incorporated as Gergebilsky Municipal District. Its four selsoviets are incorporated as ten rural settlements within the municipal district. The selo of Gergebil serves as the administrative center of both the administrative and municipal district.

References

Notes

Sources

Districts of Dagestan
